Consejo de Deportes de la Universidad Nacional de la Amazonía Peruana (sometimes referred as UNAP) is a Peruvian football club, playing in the city of Iquitos, Loreto, Peru.

History
In 2000 Copa Perú, the club classified to the Regional Stage, but was eliminated by San Juan and Power Maíz in the Group Stage.

In 2003 Copa Perú, the club classified to the National Stage, but was eliminated by Abraham Valdelomar in the Quarterfinals.

In 2004 Copa Perú, the club classified to the National Stage, but was eliminated by Deportivo Municipal in the Round of 16.

In 2005 Copa Perú, the club classified to the Regional Stage, but was eliminated by CNI in the Group Stage.

In 2007 Copa Perú, the club classified to the Regional Stage, but was eliminated by Deportivo Hospital and UNU in the Group Stage.

In 2009 Copa Perú, the club classified to the National Stage, but was eliminated by DIM in the Round of 16.

In 2010 Copa Perú, the club classified to the Regional Stage, but was eliminated by Atlético Pucallpa and Deportivo Hospital in the Group Stage.

In 2012 Copa Perú, the club classified to the Regional Stage, but was eliminated by Alianza Cristiana in the Group Stage.

Honours

Regional
Región III:
Winners (1): 2003
Runner-up (1): 2009

Región IV:
Runner-up (1): 2005

Región V:
Winners (1): 2004

Liga Departamental de Loreto:
Winners (5): 2000, 2003, 2004, 2007, 2009
Runner-up (3): 2005, 2010, 2012

Liga Provincial de Maynas:
Winners (3): 2000, 2003, 2012
Runner-up (3): 2007, 2009, 2018

Liga Distrital de Iquitos:
Winners (5): 2000, 2003, 2007, 2011, 2022
Runner-up (3): 2009, 2012, 2018

See also
List of football clubs in Peru
Peruvian football league system

References

External links
 

Football clubs in Peru